Canadian Society for Continental Philosophy (CSCP) is an organization whose purpose is to pursue and exchange philosophical ideas inspired by Continental European traditions. It was established in 1984 under the name Canadian Society for Hermeneutics and Postmodern Thought and its name changed in 2004. CSCP also publishes Symposium: Canadian Journal of Continental Philosophy and holds an annual meeting in Canada each fall.

Past Presidents
 Gary Madison
 Jeff Mitscherling
 Linda Fisher
 Marty Fairbairn
 Paul Fairfield
 Diane Enns
 Ian McDonald
 Shannon Hoff
 Scott Marratto

See also
Canadian Philosophical Association

References

External links
Official website

Philosophical societies in Canada
1984 establishments in Canada
Organizations established in 1984
Continental philosophy organizations